The 2013–14 Basketball League of Serbia season is the 8th season of the Basketball League of Serbia, the highest professional basketball league in Serbia. It is also 70th national championship played by Serbian clubs inclusive of nation's previous incarnations as Yugoslavia and Serbia & Montenegro.

The first half of the season consists of 14 teams and 182-game regular season (26 games for each of the 14 teams) began on Saturday, October 5, 2013 and will end on Sunday, March 29, 2014. The second half of the season consists of 4 teams from Adriatic League and the best 4 teams from first half of the season. The first half is called First League and  second is called Super League.

Teams for 2013–14 season

First League

Standings

Schedule and results

Positions by round

Super League

Standings

P=Matches played, W=Matches won, L=Matches lost, F=Points for, A=Points against, D=Points difference, Pts=Points

Schedule and results

Playoff stage

Semifinals
Game 1

Game 2

Final
Game 1

Game 2

Game 3

Game 4

Bracket

Stats leaders

MVP Round by Round

First League

Super League

Play off

External links
 Official website of Serbian Basketball League

References

Basketball League of Serbia seasons
Serbia
Basketball